Owharoa Falls is a staircase waterfall in Waikato, New Zealand, located off Waitawheta Road in Karangahake Gorge, near State Highway 2, between Paeroa and Waihi, and close to the small settlement of Waikino.

References

External links
 Owharoa Falls – "New Zealand Waterfalls"

Waterfalls of Waikato
Hauraki District